is a 1988 Japanese documentary film and docudrama written and directed by Kaneto Shindō. Based on a nonfictional story by Hagie Ezu, it depicts the fate of the Sakura ("cherry blossom") theatre troupe, whose members were killed in the atomic bombing of Hiroshima.

Plot
In interviews with 30 associates and friends, and in reenactments of the events, director Shindō recounts the history of the Sakura theatre troupe, formed from remnants of left-leaning troupes that had been forced to disband by the militarist regime, and its end in Hiroshima. While five members died instantly, the survivors of the blast, including the troupe's leader Sadao Maruyama and actresses Keiko Sonoi and Midori Naka, died during the following weeks from their injuries. Only two members, who weren't present in Hiroshima at the time of the bombing, survived.

Cast

Interviewees
 Koreya Senda
 Yasue Yamamoto
 Kappei Matsumoto
 Haruko Sugimura
 Seiji Ikeda
 Osamu Takizawa
 Jūkichi Uno
 Kokichi Makimura
 Taiji Tonoyama
 Hagie Ezu
 Eitarō Ozawa

Reenactment actors
 Masashi Furuta as Sadao Maruyama
 Takako Miki as Keiko Sonoi
 Yasuko Yagami as Midori Naka
 Satoshi Kawashima as Shozo Takayama
 Oikawa Izo as Kokichi Makimura

Theme
Shindō, who was born in Hiroshima Prefecture, repeatedly attempted to memorialise the bombing of his birthplace and its aftermath in films like Children of Hiroshima (1952), Mother (1963), Sakura-tai Chiru and Teacher and Three Children (2008).

Release
Sakura-tai Chiru was released in Japanese cinemas on 30 April 1988. It was later released as part of a DVD anthology box dedicated to director Shindō in 2002.

Also in 1988, Shindō published the story of the Sakura troupe in book form along with notes on the film's production.

Reception
In Kinema Junpo magazine's list of the 10 best Japanese films of the year, Sakura-tai Chiru reached #7 in 1988.

Upon the film's home media release, film historian Donald Richie commented that Shindō created a picture that would have found the interest of Shindō's mentor Kenji Mizoguchi, looking at the disaster "with clear-eyed compassion".

Comparing Sakura-tai Chiru with Shindō's earlier Children of Hiroshima, Lauri Kitsnik saw a "much more realist style" in the bombing montage sequence. At the same time, Shindō's emphasising of artificiality and mixing of styles and art forms point at "the inevitability of staging in cinema and the impossibility of non-fiction".

References

External links
 

1988 films
1988 documentary films
Japanese documentary films
Films directed by Kaneto Shindo
Films about the atomic bombings of Hiroshima and Nagasaki
Films set in Hiroshima
Films shot in Hiroshima
1980s Japanese films